Christine Frances "Chris" Stanton (née Annison, born 12 December 1959) is a retired high jumper from Australia. She set her personal best on 26 January 1985, jumping 1.96 metres at a meet in Adelaide, South Australia. An eight-time national champion in the women's high jump, she competed for her native country at three consecutive Olympic Games, in Moscow 1980, Los Angeles 1984 and Seoul 1988.

She was born in Perth, Western Australia.

National titles
8 times Australian high jump champion: 1976–77, 1980–81, 1983, 1985-87

International competitions

Notes:
 Results with a q, indicate overall position in qualifying round.
 Results in brackets, indicate superior height achieved in qualifying round.

References

External links
 
 Christine 'Chris' Stanton (Annison) at Australian Athletics Historical Results
 Women's World All-Time List

1959 births
Living people
Athletes from Perth, Western Australia
Australian female high jumpers
Australian pentathletes
Olympic athletes of Australia
Athletes (track and field) at the 1980 Summer Olympics
Athletes (track and field) at the 1984 Summer Olympics
Athletes (track and field) at the 1988 Summer Olympics
Commonwealth Games gold medallists for Australia
Commonwealth Games silver medallists for Australia
Athletes (track and field) at the 1982 Commonwealth Games
Athletes (track and field) at the 1986 Commonwealth Games
Commonwealth Games medallists in athletics
World Athletics Championships athletes for Australia
Netball players from Western Australia
Australian netball players
Medallists at the 1982 Commonwealth Games
Medallists at the 1986 Commonwealth Games